Malcolm X, an African American Muslim minister and human rights activist who was a popular figure during the civil rights movement, was assassinated in Manhattan, New York City on February21, 1965. While preparing to address the Organization of Afro-American Unity at the Audubon Ballroom in the neighborhood of Washington Heights, Malcolm X was shot multiple times and killed. Three members of the Nation of Islam, Muhammad Abdul Aziz, Khalil Islam, and Thomas Hagan, were charged, tried, and convicted of the murder and given indeterminate life sentences, but in November 2021, Aziz and Islam were exonerated.

Speculation about the assassination and whether it was conceived or aided by leading or additional members of the Nation, or by law enforcement agencies, has persisted for decades after the shooting. The assassination was one of four major assassinations of the 1960s in the United States, coming two years after the assassination of John F. Kennedy in 1963, and three years before the assassinations of Martin Luther King Jr. and Robert F. Kennedy in 1968.

Death threats and intimidation from Nation of Islam 
Throughout 1964, Malcolm X's conflict with the Nation of Islam intensified, and he was repeatedly threatened. In February, a leader of Temple Number Seven ordered the bombing of MalcolmX's car. In March, Elijah Muhammad, the leader of the Nation of Islam, told Boston minister LouisX (later known as Louis Farrakhan) that "hypocrites like Malcolm should have their heads cut off"; the April10 edition of Muhammad Speaks featured a cartoon depicting MalcolmX's bouncing, severed head.

On June8, FBI surveillance recorded a telephone call in which Betty Shabazz was told that her husband was "as good as dead." Four days later, an FBI informant received a tip that "MalcolmX is going to be bumped off." That same month, the Nation sued to reclaim MalcolmX's residence in East Elmhurst, Queens, New York. His family was ordered to vacate but on February14, 1965the night before a hearing on postponing the evictionthe house was destroyed by fire.

On July9, Muhammad aide John Ali (suspected of being an undercover FBI agent) referred to MalcolmX by saying, "Anyone who opposes the Honorable Elijah Muhammad puts their life in jeopardy." In the December4 issue of Muhammad Speaks, LouisX wrote that "such a man as Malcolm is worthy of death."

The September 1964 issue of Ebony dramatized MalcolmX's defiance of these threats by publishing a photograph of him holding an M1 carbine while peering out a window.

On February 18, Malcolm X relayed in an interview that he was a "marked man", referring to his severed ties with the Nation and how it would ultimately be the reason for his demise. He went on to say that, "No one can get out without trouble, and this thing with me will be resolved by death and violence.

On February19, 1965, MalcolmX told interviewer Gordon Parks that the Nation of Islam was actively trying to kill him.

Assassination

On February21, 1965, Malcolm X was preparing to address the Organization of Afro-American Unity in Manhattan's Audubon Ballroom when someone in the 400-person audience yelled,
"Nigger! Get your hand outta my pocket!"
As MalcolmX and his bodyguards tried to quell the disturbance, a man rushed forward and shot him once in the chest with a sawed-off shotgun and two other men charged the stage firing semi-automatic handguns. MalcolmX was pronounced dead at 3:30pm, shortly after arriving at Columbia Presbyterian Hospital. The autopsy identified 21 gunshot wounds to the chest, left shoulder, arms and legs, including ten buckshot wounds from the initial shotgun blast.

Les Payne and Tamara Payne, in their Pulitzer Prize winning biography The Dead Are Arising: The Life of Malcolm X, claim that the assassins were members of the Nation of Islam's Newark, New Jersey, mosque: William 25X (also known as William Bradley), who fired the shotgun; Leon Davis; and Talmadge Hayer (also known as Thomas Hagan).

One gunman, Nation of Islam member Talmadge Hayer, was beaten by the crowd before police arrived. Witnesses identified the other gunmen as Nation members Norman 3X Butler and Thomas 15X Johnson. All three were convicted of murder in March 1966 and sentenced to life in prison. At trial Hayer confessed, but refused to identify the other assailants except to assert that they were not Butler and Johnson.
In 1977 and 1978, he signed affidavits reasserting Butler's and Johnson's innocence, naming four other Nation members of Newark's Mosque No. 25 as participants in the murder or its planning. These affidavits did not result in the case being reopened. In 2020, the Netflix docuseries Who Killed Malcolm X? explored the assassination, which launched a new review of the murder by the office of the Manhattan District Attorney.

On November 18, 2021, Manhattan District Attorney Cyrus Vance, Jr. was expected to exonerate Butler, now known as Muhammad Abdul Aziz, and Johnson, now known as Khalil Islam, of the crime. Aziz was paroled in 1985 and became the head of the Nation's Harlem mosque in 1998; he maintains his innocence. In prison, Islam rejected the Nation's teachings and converted to Sunni Islam. Released in 1987, he maintained his innocence until his death in August 2009. Hayer, who also rejected the Nation's teachings while in prison and converted to Sunni Islam, is known today as Mujahid Halim. He was paroled in 2010.

A CNN Special Report, Witnessed: The Assassination of MalcolmX, was broadcast on February17, 2015. It featured interviews with several people who worked with him, including A. Peter Bailey and Earl Grant, as well as the daughter of MalcolmX, Ilyasah Shabazz.

Funeral 
The public viewing, February2326 at Unity Funeral Home in Harlem, was attended by some 14,000 to 30,000 mourners.
For the funeral on February27, loudspeakers were set up for the overflow crowd outside Harlem's thousand-seat Faith Temple of the Church of God in Christ, and a local television station carried the service live.

Among the civil rights leaders attending were John Lewis, Bayard Rustin, James Forman, James Farmer, Jesse Gray, and Andrew Young. Actor and activist Ossie Davis delivered the eulogy, describing MalcolmX as "our shining black prince... who didn't hesitate to die because he loved us so":
There are those who will consider it their duty, as friends of the Negro people, to tell us to revile him, to flee, even from the presence of his memory, to save ourselves by writing him out of the history of our turbulent times. Many will ask what Harlem finds to honor in this stormy, controversial and bold young captainand we will smile. Many will say turn awayaway from this man, for he is not a man but a demon, a monster, a subverter and an enemy of the black manand we will smile. They will say that he is of hatea fanatic, a racistwho can only bring evil to the cause for which you struggle! And we will answer and say to them: Did you ever talk to Brother Malcolm? Did you ever touch him, or have him smile at you? Did you ever really listen to him? Did he ever do a mean thing? Was he ever himself associated with violence or any public disturbance? For if you did you would know him. And if you knew him you would know why we must honor him.… And, in honoring him, we honor the best in ourselves.

MalcolmX was buried at Ferncliff Cemetery in Hartsdale, New York. Friends took up the gravediggers' shovels to complete the burial themselves.

Actor and activist Ruby Dee and Juanita Poitier (wife of Sidney Poitier) established the Committee of Concerned Mothers to raise money for a home for his family and for his children's educations.

Reactions 
Reactions to MalcolmX's assassination were varied. In a telegram to Betty Shabazz, Martin Luther King Jr. expressed his sadness at "the shocking and tragic assassination of your husband." He said:
While we did not always see eye to eye on methods to solve the race problem, I always had a deep affection for Malcolm and felt that he had a great ability to put his finger on the existence and root of the problem. He was an eloquent spokesman for his point of view and no one can honestly doubt that Malcolm had a great concern for the problems that we face as a race.

Elijah Muhammad told the annual Savior's Day convention on February26 that "MalcolmX got just what he preached," but denied any involvement with the murder. "We didn't want to kill Malcolm and didn't try to kill him," Muhammad said, adding "We know such ignorant, foolish teachings would bring him to his own end."

Writer James Baldwin, who had been a friend of MalcolmX, was in London when he heard the news of the assassination. He responded with indignation towards the reporters interviewing him, shouting, "You did it! It is because of you—the men that created this white supremacy—that this man is dead. You are not guilty, but you did it.… Your mills, your cities, your rape of a continent started all this."

The New York Post wrote that "even his sharpest critics recognized his brillianceoften wild, unpredictable and eccentric, but nevertheless possessing promise that must now remain unrealized." The New York Times wrote that MalcolmX was "an extraordinary and twisted man" who "turn[ed] many true gifts to evil purpose" and that his life was "strangely and pitifully wasted." Time called him "an unashamed demagogue" whose "creed was violence."

Outside of the U.S., particularly in Africa, the press was sympathetic. The Daily Times of Nigeria wrote that MalcolmX would "have a place in the palace of martyrs." The Ghanaian Times likened him to John Brown, Medgar Evers, and Patrice Lumumba, and counted him among "a host of Africans and Americans who were martyred in freedom's cause." In China, the People's Daily described MalcolmX as a martyr killed by "ruling circles and racists" in the United States; his assassination, the paper wrote, demonstrated that "in dealing with imperialist oppressors, violence must be met with violence." The Guangming Daily, also published in Beijing, stated that "Malcolm was murdered because he fought for freedom and equal rights." In Cuba, El Mundo described the assassination as "another racist crime to eradicate by violence the struggle against discrimination."

In a weekly column he wrote for the New York Amsterdam News, King reflected on MalcolmX and his
assassination:
 MalcolmX came to the fore as a public figure partially as a result of a TV documentary entitled, The Hate that Hate Produced. That title points to the nature of Malcolm's life and death.

MalcolmX was clearly a product of the hate and violence invested in the Negro's blighted existence in this nation.…

In his youth, there was no hope, no preaching, teaching or movements of non-violence.…

It is a testimony to Malcolm's personal depth and integrity that he could not become an underworld Czar, but turned again and again to religion for meaning and destiny. Malcolm was still turning and growing at the time of his brutal and meaningless assassination.…

Like the murder of Lumumba, the murder of MalcolmX deprives the world of a potentially great leader. I could not agree with either of these men, but I could see in them a capacity for leadership which I could respect, and which was just beginning to mature in judgment and statesmanship.

Allegations of conspiracy 

Within days, the question of who bore responsibility for the assassination was being publicly debated. On February23, James Farmer, leader of the Congress of Racial Equality, announced at a news conference that local drug dealers, and not the Nation of Islam, were to blame. Others accused the NYPD, the FBI, or the CIA, citing the lack of police protection, the ease with which the assassins entered the Audubon Ballroom, and the failure of the police to preserve the crime scene. Earl Grant, one of MalcolmX's associates who was present at the assassination, later wrote:

[A]bout five minutes later, a most incredible scene took place. Into the hall sauntered about a dozen policemen. They were strolling at about the pace one would expect of them if they were patrolling a quiet park. They did not seem to be at all excited or concerned about the circumstances.I could hardly believe my eyes. Here were New York City policemen, entering a room from which at least a dozen shots had been heard, and yet not one of them had his gun out! As a matter of absolute fact, some of them even had their hands in their pockets.

In the 1970s, the public learned about COINTELPRO and other secret FBI programs established to infiltrate and disrupt civil rights organizations during the 1950s and 1960s. Louis Lomax wrote that John Ali, national secretary of the Nation of Islam, was a former FBI agent. Ali, however, had denied in an interview that he had ever worked for the FBI, instead stating he was only interviewed. Malcolm X had confided to a reporter that Ali exacerbated tensions between him and Elijah Muhammad and that he considered Ali his "archenemy" within the Nation of Islam leadership. Ali had a meeting with Talmadge Hayer, one of the men convicted of killing MalcolmX, the night before the assassination.

The Shabazz family are among those who have accused Louis Farrakhan of involvement in MalcolmX's assassination. In a 1993 speech Farrakhan seemed to acknowledge the possibility that the Nation of Islam was responsible: For many years, Betty Shabazz, the widow of Malcolm X, harbored resentment toward the Nation of Islam—and Farrakhan in particular—for what she felt was their role in the assassination of her husband. In a 1993 speech, Farrakhan seemed to confirm that the Nation of Islam was responsible for the assassination:

We don't give a damn about no white man law if you attack what we love. And frankly, it ain't none of your business. What do you got to say about it? Did you teach Malcolm? Did you make Malcolm? Did you clean up Malcolm? Did you put Malcolm out before the world? Was Malcolm your traitor or ours? And if we dealt with him like a nation deals with a traitor, what the hell business is it of yours? You just shut your mouth, and stay out of it. Because in the future, we gonna become a nation. And a nation gotta be able to deal with traitors and cutthroats and turncoats. The white man deals with his. The Jews deal with theirs.

During a 1994 interview, Gabe Pressman asked Shabazz whether Farrakhan "had anything to do" with Malcolm X's death. She replied: "Of course, yes. Nobody kept it a secret. It was a badge of honor. Everybody talked about it, yes."

In a 60 Minutes interview that aired during May 2000, Farrakhan stated that some of the things he said may have led to the assassination of Malcolm X. "I may have been complicit in words that I spoke", he said. "I acknowledge that and regret that any word that I have said caused the loss of life of a human being." A few days later Farrakhan denied that he "ordered the assassination" of Malcolm X, although he again acknowledged that he "created the atmosphere that ultimately led to Malcolm X's assassination."

No consensus has been reached on who was responsible for the assassination. In August 2014, an online petition was started using the White House online petition mechanism to call on the government to release, without alteration, any files it still held relating to the murder of MalcolmX. In January 2019, members of the families of MalcolmX, Martin Luther King Jr., and the Kennedy family were among dozens of Americans who signed a public statement calling for a truth and reconciliation commission to persuade Congress or the Justice Department to review the assassinations of all four leaders during the 1960s. On February 21, 2021, the family of deceased NYPD detective Raymond Wood, alongside three of Malcolm X's daughters, released a letter purportedly written by Wood which claimed NYPD and FBI involvement in the assassination, however, others claim the letter was falsified by Wood's cousin.

Portrayals in popular culture
The assassination has been portrayed in various media, including the 1981 television film, Death of a Prophet, and the 1992 motion picture MalcolmX.

Death of a Prophet, starring Morgan Freeman as Malcolm X, was primarily focused on the assassination. The Pittsburgh Post-Gazette said that the film "will stimulate discussion, but it won't shed any light on the [assassination] itself... To say Death of a Prophet takes liberties with the facts is an understatement, but the degree to which it does can be a bit irritating at times... Still, the film manages to capture an essential truth—Malcolm X was perceived in some circles and our government as a dangerous man because of his eloquence, self-discipline and unswerving dedication to black liberation."

Malcolm X, starring Denzel Washington, portrayed the assassination as having been conducted by members of the Nation of Islam, going with Hayer's testimony of who was there, with Giancarlo Esposito, Wendell Pierce, Leonard L. Thomas, Leland Gantt, and Michael Guess portraying the assassins. Producer Marvin Worth had acquired the rights to The Autobiography of Malcolm X in 1967, but the production had difficulties telling the entire story, in part due to unresolved questions surrounding the assassination.  In 1971, Worth made a well-received documentary, Malcolm X, which received an Academy Award nomination in that category.

Who Killed Malcolm X?, a 2020 Netflix docuseries on the event, led to a review of the murder by the office of the Manhattan District Attorney.

The 2001 biographical film Ali, starring Will Smith as Muhammad Ali, depicts the assassination of Malcolm X, portrayed by American actor Mario Van Peebles.

See also
Assassination of Martin Luther King Jr.

Notes

References

Malcolm X
Malcolm X
1965 murders in the United States
February 1965 events in the United States
1965 in New York City